Martina Bunge (18 May 1951 in Leipzig – 1 May 2022) was a German politician and member of "die Linke" (The Left).

References

External links 
 Biography by German Bundestag

1951 births
2022 deaths
Politicians from Leipzig
University of Rostock alumni
Members of the Bundestag for Mecklenburg-Western Pomerania
21st-century German women politicians
Members of the Bundestag 2009–2013
Members of the Bundestag 2005–2009
Members of the Bundestag for The Left